Alfredo Bracchi (30 December 1897 – 11 October 1976) was a versatile Italian writer, whose production ranged from song lyrics to movie scripts.

Bracchi was born in Milan, Italy.  Between the 1930s and 1950s he and Giovanni D'Anzi formed a very prolific pair of songwriters. They worked for radio, cinema and theater productions. Several of their songs were great hits. Among them Ma le gambe, Bambina innamorata, Ma l'amore no, Ti parlerò d'amor, El Biscella.
The grave is inside Civico Mausoleo Palanti at Cimitero Monumentale di Milano.

External links 

1897 births
1976 deaths
20th-century Italian musicians
Burials at the Cimitero Monumentale di Milano
Italian songwriters
Male songwriters
Italian lyricists
20th-century Italian screenwriters
Italian male screenwriters
20th-century Italian male musicians
20th-century Italian male writers